Cherokee Landing State Park is a  Oklahoma state park located in Cherokee County, Oklahoma. It is located near Park Hill, Oklahoma on a peninsula jutting into Lake Tenkiller in the Cookson Hills, south of Tahlequah. The park features 93 RV campsites with electric power and water hookups, dump station, 45 primitive campsites, covered picnic shelters, restrooms with hot showers, boating, lighted boat ramp, water skiing, swimming beach, fishing, handicapped fishing dock, playgrounds and a softball field.

The park is open seven days per week from 7:30 A.M. to 4:00 P.M., though the office is staffed by a volunteer only Wednesday through Saturday 9:00 A.M. through 2:00 P.M.

Hunting is not allowed in the park, but there is a  area west of the park boundary that is a  state game management and hunting area. This area is under the jurisdiction of the Oklahoma Department of Wildlife Conservation. Hunting is allowed there. Popular game species for hunting are :deer, quail, dove, duck, geese, rabbit and squirrel.

The main road into the parks and the boat ramps is open year-round. Wildcat Point is closed November 1 to April 1. All other restrooms and campgrounds are closed from December 1 until March 1.

Fees
To help fund a backlog of deferred maintenance and park improvements, the state implemented an entrance fee for this park and 21 others effective June 15, 2020. The fees, charged per vehicle, start at $10 per day for a single-day or $8 for residents with an Oklahoma license plate or Oklahoma tribal plate. Fees are waived for honorably discharged veterans and Oklahoma residents age 62 & older and their spouses. Passes good for three days or a week are also available; annual passes good at all 22 state parks charging fees are offered at a cost of $75 for out-of-state visitors or $60 for Oklahoma residents. The 22 parks are:
 Arrowhead Area at Lake Eufaula State Park
 Beavers Bend State Park
 Boiling Springs State Park
 Cherokee Landing State Park
 Fort Cobb State Park
 Foss State Park
 Honey Creek Area at Grand Lake State Park
 Great Plains State Park
 Great Salt Plains State Park
 Greenleaf State Park
 Keystone State Park
 Lake Eufaula State Park
 Lake Murray State Park
 Lake Texoma State Park
 Lake Thunderbird State Park
 Lake Wister State Park
 Natural Falls State Park
 Osage Hills State Park
 Robbers Cave State Park
 Sequoyah State Park
 Tenkiller State Park
 Twin Bridges Area at Grand Lake State Park

See also
Lake Tenkiller

References

External links
 "Cherokee Landing State Park." Images of Cherokee Landing State Park.

State parks of Oklahoma
Protected areas of Cherokee County, Oklahoma